Maximovskoye is a rural locality (a village) in Ugolskoye Rural Settlement, Sheksninsky District, Vologda Oblast, Russia. The population was 19 as of 2002.

Geography 
Maximovskoye is located 15 km southeast of Sheksna (the district's administrative centre) by road. Pokrovskoye is the nearest rural locality.

References 

Rural localities in Sheksninsky District